Christian Donald Eckes (pronounced "eck-iss"; born November 10, 2000) is an American professional stock car racing driver. He competes full-time in the NASCAR Craftsman Truck Series, driving the No. 19 Chevrolet Silverado for McAnally-Hilgemann Racing. Eckes is the 2019 ARCA Menards Series champion, won the Snowball Derby in 2016, and was formerly a development driver for JR Motorsports and later Toyota.

Racing career
Eckes grew up in Greenville, New York. He began racing Legends Cars at thirteen years old. He later moved up to racing late model stock cars and super late models.

In 2015, Eckes began racing late models for JR Motorsports, as well as super late models for LFR Chassis as one of their driver development program drivers.

In April 2016, Eckes made his ARCA Racing Series debut at the Nashville Fairgrounds Speedway in Tennessee, driving for Venturini Motorsports. He finished eighth, the only top-ten in four ARCA races that year. Eckes also made his NASCAR K&N Pro Series East debut at Dominion Raceway. He ran two more events that year, at Columbus Motor Speedway and New Hampshire Motor Speedway.

He won three races in a row to end the season, one at Myrtle Beach Speedway, at Southern National Motorsports Park and the Snowball Derby, at Five Flags Speedway. At the Snowball Derby, Eckes won over John Hunter Nemechek. Although some reports pegged him as the youngest winner, those reports were erroneous, as Chase Elliott won the event in 2011 at age fifteen while Eckes was sixteen when he triumphed.

In December 2016, Eckes and Venturini announced nine ARCA races in 2017.

In July 2017, Eckes and Venturini re-signed for an enlarged ARCA schedule in 2018 that included fifteen races. He triumphed for the first time at Salem Speedway in April 2018. Eckes kept fellow Venturini Motorsports driver Chandler Smith at bay over the closing portion of the race to secure the victory. He followed up with wins at Illinois State Fairgrounds and Indianapolis Raceway Park during the year.

In the week following the win, Eckes landed a deal with NASCAR Camping World Truck Series team Kyle Busch Motorsports to drive the team's No. 46 entry in four races in the 2018 NASCAR Camping World Truck Series season, starting at Iowa Speedway in June.

On October 24, 2018, it was announced that Eckes would run the No. 15 full-time for Venturini Motorsports in 2019. Despite missing the Salem Speedway race in April due to a esophageal tear in his trachea, he went on to win the 2019 ARCA Menards Series championship with four wins, 13 top fives, and 17 top tens in 19 starts. Eckes was the first ARCA champion to not run every race since Tim Steele in 1997.

During the 2019 season, he ran eight races in the Truck Series with KBM in the No. 51. Finishing 3rd at Homestead later that year, Eckes locked up KBM’s 7th Owner’s Championship. 

The following year, he joined the team's No. 18 for the full 2020 Truck season. Eckes made the NASCAR playoffs but was eliminated after the first round; at Texas in October, Eckes was intentionally spun by Ben Rhodes, eliminating Eckes from the race. He later confronted Rhodes and had a verbal and physical confrontation. He finished with a winless season and an eighth-place finish in the standings.

In 2021, Eckes moved to ThorSport Racing after being replaced at KBM by Chandler Smith. He entered 10 races of the 22-race season, sharing the schedule with Grant Enfinger.

In 2022, after his maiden win at Las Vegas, Eckes would move up to full-time in the No. 98 after Enfinger moved back to GMS Racing. He finished and tied a career-best 8th in the final standings, despite having no wins.

On December 6th, 2022, McAnally-Hilgemann Racing announced that Eckes would pilot the No. 19 NAPA Auto Care Chevrolet Silverado in 2023, replacing Derek Kraus. Eckes started the 2023 season with a third place finish at Daytona. He then scored a win at Atlanta.

Personal life
Eckes was born on November 10, 2000 to George and Darlene Eckes. He has an older sister, Erica. Christian Eckes attended George Washington University Online High School.

Motorsports career results

NASCAR
(key) (Bold – Pole position awarded by qualifying time. Italics – Pole position earned by points standings or practice time. * – Most laps led.)

Craftsman Truck Series

 Season still in progress
 Ineligible for series points

K&N Pro Series East

ARCA Menards Series
(key) (Bold – Pole position awarded by qualifying time. Italics – Pole position earned by points standings or practice time. * – Most laps led.)

References

External links
 
 Official profile at McAnally-Hilgemann Racing
 

Living people
Racing drivers from New York (state)
ARCA Menards Series drivers
People from Orange County, New York
2000 births
NASCAR drivers
Kyle Busch Motorsports drivers
JR Motorsports drivers